Emmanuelle 4 (also released as Emmanuelle IV) is 1984 French film in English directed by Francis Leroi and Iris Letans. It is the fourth official theatrical feature film in the Emmanuelle franchise. It is also the last film credit for 1962 Academy Award and Golden Globe nominee Michel Magne, as the film-score composer committed suicide in a hotel room ten months after its release.

Plot 
Sylvia (Sylvia Kristel) is involved in a tormented love affair with Marc (Patrick Bauchau). She has tried to end their love, and escape, but always ends up back with him. After an encounter at a Los Angeles party, she decides she's had enough - she will go to Brazil and get extensive plastic surgery. This way he will never recognize her again, much less find her, and it will make for a great article which she promises to hand in to a California newspaper.

Sylvia goes through with it, and becomes a new woman named Emmanuelle (Mia Nygren); she is now a twenty-year-old virgin. She plans to take on all of Brazil in a series of sexual escapades that will purge her past.

Cast 
 Sylvia Kristel as Sylvia / Emmanuelle
 Mia Nygren (Mia Rickfors) as Emmanuelle
 Patrick Bauchau as Marc
 Deborah Power as Donna
 Sophie Berger as Maria
 Marilyn Jess (Dominique Troyes) as Nadine
 Christian Marquand as Dr. Santano
 Fabrice Luchini as Oswaldo
 Brinke Stevens as Dream Girl

Release
Emmanuelle 4 was released in France on 15 February 1984. On its first week in Paris, the film sold 122,009 tickets. At the end of its theatrical run in Paris, it had sold a total of 455,882.

Reception
In a contemporary review, John Pym of the Monthly Film Bulletin stated that "a reach-me-down mish-mash, padded with flashbacks and what appear to be hardcore sequences, and scissored by many hands." The review also commented on the 3D in the film, as "barely noticeable".

References

External links
 
 

1984 films
1980s pornographic films
Films shot in France
Films shot in Brazil
Films set in Brazil
Emmanuelle
1980s erotic drama films
French erotic drama films
Golan-Globus films
1984 drama films
1980s English-language films
1980s French films